Iveta Roubíčková, née Knížková (born 3 March 1967) is a Czech biathlete. She competed at the 1992 Winter Olympics and the 1994 Winter Olympics.

References

External links
 

1967 births
Living people
Biathletes at the 1992 Winter Olympics
Biathletes at the 1994 Winter Olympics
Czech female biathletes
Olympic biathletes of Czechoslovakia
Olympic biathletes of the Czech Republic
Sportspeople from Karlovy Vary